The Fairford stained glass is a set of 28 pre-Reformation stained glass windows located in St Mary's Church, Fairford, Gloucestershire. The medieval stained glass panes are of national historical and architectural importance as they constitute what is "probably the most complete set of medieval stained glass in Britain" consisting of 28 windows displaying biblical scenes. They were added after the church had been rebuilt by the wealthy wool merchant John Tame (c.1430–1500). The glass was made between 1500 and 1517 under the instructions of his son, Edward Tame.

The panes were once known as an example of Netherlandish-style glass painting, however they are now attributed to the Flemish glazier Barnard Flower (d.1517), glazier to King Henry VII (1485–1509), and according to some sources, also to John Thornton of Coventry and Galyon Hone. Several sources indicate that the overall design windows can probably be credited to Richard Fox, Bishop of Durham, later of Winchester.

The traditional story concerning the origin of the windows is related as follows by the Gloucestershire historian Bigland (d.1784) in his Account of the Parish of Fairford:
"About the year 1492 soon after the Siege of Boloigne, a vessel bound to the port of Rome from the Low Countries and laden with painted glass, is said to have been taken by him (i.e. John Tame) who instantly determined on preparing a church here for its reception".

Most of the 28 windows comprise four separate lancets, usually each one displaying a different but related, biblical scene, beneath painted gothic canopy-work. Six smaller lights occupy the space at the apex of the gothic arched windows, usually displaying decorative features of angels, where the scenes below are supportive of the Christian faith, or of devils where opposed.

Survival over the centuries
The glass survived the Reformation when many images in English churches were destroyed. In 1642, during the Civil War, they narrowly avoided destruction when the Roundhead army was marching on the nearby town of Cirencester. It was customary at that time for cavalry of both sides to convert churches into temporary stables and barracks with little regard paid to the fabric of the buildings. The more puritan elements amongst the Roundheads were opposed to the pre-Reformation's so-called idolatrous imagery, making it likely that the stained glass would be destroyed. However, on the quick-thinking order of William Oldysworth, the impropriator (lessee) of the tithes of Fairford, the windows were hurriedly dismantled and the glass concealed before the troops arrived in the vicinity. "To him the lovers of ancient art are indebted for its present existence" (Bigland, 1791).

It may have been during the re-erection of the glass after the Civil War when some of the panes were replaced in the wrong positions. In 1725 the glass was protected by the addition of a "lattice of wire" to each window, paid for at the great cost of £200 by Elizabeth Fermor, a daughter of William Fermor, 1st Baron Leominster (1648–1711), by his first wife Jane Barker, a daughter of Andrew Barker of Fairford. Andrew Barker was of the ancient Barker (alias De Calverhall) family of Coverall (or Calverhall) castle and Hopton Castle both in Shropshire, and had acquired the manor of Fairford in about 1660.

A few of the panes were damaged during a storm in November 1703; they were either repaired, some being modified or replaced. During 1889-90 twenty-six windows were repaired and re-leaded.

During the Second World War, the stained glass windows were removed and stored in a cellar for safekeeping from 1939 to 1945.

A conservation and restoration programme began in 1988 and finished in 2010. Clear glass now protects the old glass.

Descriptions
Descriptions of the history and imagery of the windows is contained in the following sources:
Bigland, Ralph, An Account of the Parish of Fairford in the County of Gloucester with a Particular Description of the Stained Glass in the Windows of the Church, Engravings of Ancient Monuments with Inscriptions, etc., etc., London, 1791, pp. 6–10
Neale, John Mason, (ed.) Illustrations of Monumental Brasses, No.VI, Cambridge Camden Society, Cambridge, 1846, pp. 115–132

Images
The 28 stained glass windows in St Mary's Church, Fairford, are shown below, numbered and described by Neale, John Mason, (ed.) Illustrations of Monumental Brasses, No.VI, Cambridge Camden Society, Cambridge, 1846, pp. 115–132

References

Further reading
Neale, John Mason, (ed.) Illustrations of Monumental Brasses, No.VI, Cambridge, Cambridge Camden Society, 1846, pp. 115–132 
Joyce, Rev.J.G., On The Fairford Windows, 1872, pp. 15–40, history of Tame family.

Gloucestershire Notes & Queries: Monumental Brasses, pp. 141–149 & 99–103.
Bigland, Ralph, History of Gloucestershire, Vol.1, p. 571, illustration.
</ref>
Davis, Cecil T., The Monumental Brasses of Gloucestershire, 1899.
Visitation of the County of Gloucester Taken in the Year 1623 by Henry Chitty and John Phillipot, ed. Maclean, Sir John, London, 1885, p. 260, pedigree of Tame

Stained glass windows
Tourist attractions in Gloucestershire
Fairford